Prince Oskar Karl Gustav Adolf of Prussia (27 July 1888 – 27 January 1958) was the fifth son of German Emperor Wilhelm II and Augusta Victoria of Schleswig-Holstein-Sonderburg-Augustenburg.

Biography

Birth and family

Prinz Oskar of Prussia was born on 27 July 1888 at his parents' residence in the Marmorpalais of Potsdam in the Province of Brandenburg. He was the fifth son of the German Emperor Wilhelm II, and his first wife, Princess Augusta Victoria of Schleswig-Holstein, and was born in the so-called Year of the Three Emperors, just a month after his 29-year-old father had become German Emperor and King of Prussia. He was baptised in the chapel of the Royal Palace on the Spree Island in central Berlin and was named after King Oscar II of Sweden and Norway, who was also his godfather.

Prince Oskar had five brothers: Crown Prince Wilhelm, Prince Eitel Friedrich, Prince Adalbert, Prince August Wilhelm, Prince Joachim and one sister: Princess Viktoria Luise. He spent his childhood with his six siblings at the New Palace, also in Potsdam.

Education
Prince Oskar was educated as a cadet at the Prinzenhaus in Plön, in his mother's ancestral Schleswig-Holstein, as his brothers had been before him. He made the news in 1902 when he fractured his collar bone after a fall from the horizontal bars.

Military career
During the early months of the First World War, he commanded Grenadierregiment "König Wilhelm I." (2. Westpreussisches) Nr. 7 in the field as its colonel.  Future fighter ace Manfred von Richthofen witnessed the 22 August 1914, attack on Virton, Belgium, and wrote of Prinz Oskar's bravery and his inspirational leadership at the front of his regiment as they went into combat.  For this action, Oskar earned the Iron Cross, Second Class.  A month later, at Verdun, Oskar again led his men in a successful assault into heavy combat, and was awarded the Iron Cross, First Class. After this action, he also collapsed and had to be removed from the field. Awarded the wound badge for his injuries, he spent much of the autumn of 1914 recovering from what was reported to be a heart condition.  He eventually returned to duty and served on the Eastern Front, where he was again awarded the wound badge.

In the early 1920s, his name was listed with other members of the general staff or the royal family accused of war crimes, and was condemned in the Press for applying for a colonel's pension from the Weimar Republic.

During the 1930s, when the Hohenzollern family attempted to test the waters for a return to power through Nationalist Socialism, Oskar appears to have played along, and eventually was commissioned at Generalmajor zur Verfügung (rank equivalent to brigadier general, "available for assignment"), circa 1 March 1940.  As the family fell out of favour with Hitler (with the exception of Oskar's middle brother, August Wilhelm), it became evident that there would be no restoration of the monarchy through the Nazis.

With the early battlefield deaths of Oskar's son (also named Oskar, killed in Poland, September 1939) and his nephew (Wilhelm, son of the Crown Prince, died of wounds received in France, May 1940) the German people harboured a newfound sentiment for the royal family amidst the totalitarian regime that was Nazi Germany.  As a consequence, the majority of royals serving in the German Armed Forces appear to have had their commissions canceled, including Prinz Oskar.

Master of Knights, Protestant Order of Saint John

The Johanniterorden (The Order of Saint John (Bailiwick of Brandenburg)) was a favourite of the Hohenzollerns, historically, and of Prince Oskar's immediate family specifically.  His father and uncle were members, and his brother, Eitel Friedrich, served as its Master of Knights (Herrenmeister), from 1907 to 1926.   Prinz Oskar served as the thirty-fifth Master of Knights from Eitel Friedrich's resignation in 1926 until his death in 1958.  Modern historians credit Prinz Oskar for saving the ancient order from oblivion during the cultural purges of the Nazi regime.  It is from this struggle that he held his anti-Nazi sentiments.  After his death in 1958, his youngest son, Prinz Wilhelm Karl, became his permanent successor. Prinz Oskar's grandson and namesake, Dr. Oskar Hohenzollern, is the current (thirty-seventh) Master of Knights.

Marriage and issue
Prinz Oskar was married on 31 July 1914 to Countess Ina-Marie Helene Adele Elise von Bassewitz (27 January 1888 – 17 September 1973). On 27 July 1914, prior to the wedding, Ina Marie was granted the title "Countess von Ruppin". Both the civil and religious ceremonies took place at Schloß Bellevue near Berlin, Prussia. Initially the union was a morganatic marriage, but on 3 November 1919 was decreed to be dynastic in accordance with the house laws of the Royal House of Hohenzollern. Henceforth, from 21 June 1920, his wife was titled "Princess of Prussia" with the style Royal Highness. The couple had four children:

 Prince Oskar Wilhelm Karl Hans Kuno of Prussia (12 July 1915 Potsdam – 5 September 1939 Poland); died in World War II.
 Prince Burchard Friedrich Max Werner Georg of Prussia (8 January 1917 – 12 August 1988), married Countess Eleonore Fugger von Babenhausen on 30 January 1961, no issue.
 Princess Herzeleide Ina Marie Sophie Charlotte Else of Prussia (25 December 1918 – 22 March 1989), married Karl, Prince Biron von Kurland on 15 August 1938, with issue.
 Prince Wilhelm-Karl Adalbert Erich Detloff of Prussia (20 January 1922 – 9 April 2007), married Armgard Else Helene von Veltheim on 1 March 1952, with issue.

Prince Oskar, whose health declined during the final years of his life, died of stomach cancer in a clinic in Munich on 27 January 1958, on what would have been his father's 99th birthday as his last surviving son.

Regimental commissions

 Garderegiment zu Fuß (1st Regiment of Foot Guards), Leutnant from 1898, Hauptman (captain) through 1914.
 Grenadierregiment "Konig Wilhelm I." (2. Westpreussisches) Nr. 7, à la suite before 1908, Oberst (colonel) during World War I.
 Gardegrenadierlandwehrregiment (3rd Reserve Regiment of Grenadier Guards), à la suite before 1908.

Honours
He received the following orders and decorations:

Ancestry

References

External links

 List of Herrenmeisters of the Johanniterordens on the German language Wikipedia: 
 

1888 births
1958 deaths
Protestants in the German Resistance
House of Hohenzollern
Military personnel from Potsdam
Prussian princes
German monarchists
Major generals of the German Army (Wehrmacht)
Recipients of the Order of the Netherlands Lion
Annulled Honorary Knights Grand Cross of the Royal Victorian Order
Sons of emperors
Children of Wilhelm II, German Emperor
Sons of kings